The Boulder Creek Bridge near Boulder, Colorado is a concrete slab and girder bridge which was built in 1953.  It was listed on the National Register of Historic Places in 2003.

It brings Colorado State Highway 119 over Boulder Creek, and was under Federal rather than state management as the highway provides access from Boulder to the Roosevelt National Forest.

It was designed by the U.S. Bureau of Public Roads. It has concrete abutments, wingwalls, and spill-through piers. Steel flex beams on the approach were a later addition.

It was deemed technologically significant as one of the first concrete girder bridges in Colorado of a new type, having parabolically arched beams rather than flat ones, and supported by concrete spill through piers.

References

National Register of Historic Places in Boulder County, Colorado
Bridges completed in 1953
Bridges on the National Register of Historic Places in Colorado
1953 establishments in Colorado